EPI-7386 is an N-terminal domain antiandrogen, or antagonist of the N-terminal domain (NTD) of the androgen receptor (AR), which is under development for the treatment of prostate cancer. The compound was developed as a successor of previous drugs in the EPI series such as EPI-001, ralaniten (EPI-002), and ralaniten acetate (EPI-506). EPI-7386 shows 20-fold higher antiandrogenic potency than ralaniten in vitro ( = 535 nM vs. 9,580 nM, respectively), as well as greater stability in human hepatocytes. It is planned to enter phase I clinical trials in 2020.

References 

Experimental cancer drugs
Nonsteroidal antiandrogens